Bayreuth is an electoral constituency (German: Wahlkreis) represented in the Bundestag. It elects one member via first-past-the-post voting. Under the current constituency numbering system, it is designated as constituency 237. It is located in northern Bavaria, comprising the city of Bayreuth, the Landkreis Bayreuth district, and the eastern part of the Forchheim district.

Bayreuth was created for the inaugural 1949 federal election. Since 2017, it has been represented by Silke Launert of the Christian Social Union (CSU).

Geography
Bayreuth is located in northern Bavaria. As of the 2021 federal election, it comprises the independent city of Bayreuth, the Landkreis Bayreuth district, and the municipalities of Egloffstein, Gößweinstein, Obertrubach, Pretzfeld, and Wiesenttal and Verwaltungsgemeinschaften of Ebermannstadt and Gräfenberg from the Forchheim district.

History
Bayreuth was created in 1949. In the 1949 election, it was Bavaria constituency 25 in the numbering system. In the 1953 through 1961 elections, it was number 220. In the 1965 through 1998 elections, it was number 223. In the 2002 and 2005 elections, it was number 238. Since the 2009 election, it has been number 237.

Originally, the constituency comprised the independent cities of Bayreuth and Marktredwitz and the districts of Landkreis Bayreuth and Wunsiedel. In the 1965 through 1972 elections, it also contained the Pegnitz district. In the 1976 through 1998 elections, it comprised the city of Bayreuth and Landkreis Bayreuth district. It acquired its current borders in the 2002 election.

Members
The constituency was first represented by Matthäus Herrmann of the Social Democratic Party (SPD) from 1949 to 1953, followed by fellow SPD member Herbert Hauffe from 1953 to 1957. Albrecht Schlee of the Christian Social Union (CSU) won it in 1957, but former member Hauffe regained it for the SPD in 1961. Former member Schlee was then elected in 1965 and 1969. Richard Müller of the SPD was elected in 1972 and served a single term. Heinz Starke of the CSU was representative from 1976 to 1980, followed by Ortwin Lowack from 1980 to 1994. Hartmut Koschyk of the CSU then served from 1994 to 2017. Silke Launert of the CSU was elected in 2017 and re-elected in 2021.

Election results

2021 election

2017 election

2013 election

2009 election

References

Federal electoral districts in Bavaria
1949 establishments in West Germany
Constituencies established in 1949
Bayreuth
Bayreuth (district)
Forchheim (district)